Atuna nannodes is a tree in the family Chrysobalanaceae. The specific epithet  is from the Greek meaning "dwarf", referring to the tree's small size.

Description
The smooth bark is dark grey. The flowers are white.

Distribution and habitat
Atuna nannodes grows naturally in Peninsular Malaysia and Borneo. Its habitat is forests from sea-level to  altitude.

References

nannodes
Trees of Peninsular Malaysia
Trees of Borneo
Plants described in 1965